Kanwal Thakar Singh (born Kanwal Thakar Kaur) is a former Indian badminton player and an Arjuna Award recipient. She presently lives in the United States of America.

Early life 
Singh was born on 2 November 1954 in Chandigarh, India in a Jat Sikh family to an Army officer Colonel Thakur Singh Sandhu and theatre actress Diljit Kaur. Singh's sister Kirron Kher is a Bollywood actress and a member of Bharatiya Janata Party.

Education 
Singh was bright at studies and finished her post graduation in History from the Post Graduate Government College for Girls, Chandigarh. She was a topper in her class.

Badminton 
Singh started playing badminton at the young age of 11. She won the women's singles title at the Punjab State Championship at the age of 15 and made her foray into the national games.

In 1974, she was a runners up to Ami Ghia in the National Championship at Ludhiana.

She won a silver medal in the team event at the Jinnah Centenary Championship at Karachi in 1976.

Singh won her first singles title at Panjim in 1977. Then she again won the Women's Singles title at the National Championships. In 1978 she was able to defend her title and was also successful in women's doubles played against Ami Ghia . It was the same year that she became a member of the Indian team that participated in the Uber Cup competition against Malaysia in Kuala Lumpur.

At the 1978 Commonwealth Games in Edmonton, she won bronze in doubles with Ami Ghia.

Ami Ghia and Singh reached the quarterfinals at the All England Championship in 1979 where they lost to the top seeded Indonesian pair of Verawati Vaharo and Imelda Wigeono.

In 1981, Singh won gold in the doubles and then a bronze in 1982 New Delhi Asian Games both in Team and Mixes Doubles events.

In July, 2002 she became the Chief Patron of the Chandigarh Badminton Players Welfare Association.

Awards 
In 1977-78, Singh was the recipient of the Arjuna Award. She also won the Maharaja Ranjit Singh Award.

References

External links
 

1954 births
Living people
Indian female badminton players
Indian national badminton champions
Recipients of the Arjuna Award
20th-century Indian women
20th-century Indian people
Asian Games medalists in badminton
Badminton players at the 1978 Asian Games
Badminton players at the 1982 Asian Games
Asian Games bronze medalists for India
Medalists at the 1982 Asian Games
Badminton players at the 1978 Commonwealth Games
Badminton players at the 1982 Commonwealth Games
Commonwealth Games bronze medallists for India
Commonwealth Games medallists in badminton
Medallists at the 1978 Commonwealth Games